The Terrell Red Stockings were a minor league baseball team based in Terrell, Texas. In 1907, the Red Stockings played as members of the Class D level North Texas League, hosting home games at Gill Park before the league disbanded during the season. Terrell was in last place when the North Texas League folded.

History

In 1907, the Terrell Red Stockings became members of the 1907 four–team, Class D level North Texas League. The Corsicana Oilers, Greenville Hunters and Paris Athletics joined Terrell in beginning league play on April 30, 1907.

The "Red Stockings" team name corresponded to the red stirrups with their uniforms.

On June 30, 1907, Terrell had compiled a 19–38 record and were in last place, when the four–team league folded. Lucius Rash, Cy Malkey, Rube Walters and Scudder Bell all served as managers of the Red Stockings during the season. Terrell finished 18.0 games behind the 1st place Corsicana Oilers, who finished 38–21 and ahead of 2nd place Paris and 3rd place Greenville.

The Terrell Red Stockings were succeeded by the 1915 Terrell Cubs, who began play as members of the Class D level Central Texas League.

The ballpark
The Terrell Red Stockings hosted 1907 minor league home games at Gill Park. Today, Gill Park is still in use as a public park with multiple baseball facilities.

Year–by–year record

Notable alumni
No 1907 Terrell Red Sox players advanced to the major leagues.

References

External links
 Baseball Reference

Defunct minor league baseball teams
Professional baseball teams in Texas
Defunct baseball teams in Texas
Baseball teams established in 1907
Baseball teams disestablished in 1907
1907 establishments in Texas
1907 disestablishments in Texas
Kaufman County, Texas
North Texas League teams